The 2000 United States House of Representatives election in Wyoming were held on November 7, 2000 to determine who will represent the state of Wyoming in the United States House of Representatives. Wyoming has one, at large district in the House, apportioned according to the 1990 United States Census, due to its low population. Representatives are elected for two-year terms.

Major candidates

Democratic 
Michael Allen Green

Republican 
Barbara Cubin, incumbent U.S. Congresswoman

Results

References 

2000 Wyoming elections
Wyoming
2000